Facundo Valentín Buonanotte (born 23 December 2004) is an Argentine professional footballer who plays as an attacking midfielder for Premier League club Brighton & Hove Albion.

Club career

Rosario Central
Buonanotte is a product of the youth academy of Rosario Central since the age of 10. He made his professional debut as a substitute for Rosario Central against Arsenal de Sarandí on 11 February 2022. In a Copa Argentina penalty shootout win over Sol de Mayo on 13 May 2022, he scored the game-winning penalty. The next day, on 14 May 2022, he signed his first professional contract with Rosario Central. He scored his first senior goal in a 1–0 Argentine Primera División win over Sarmiento on 8 July 2022.

Brighton & Hove Albion
On 1 January 2023, Buonanotte joined the academy of Premier League club Brighton & Hove Albion for an estimated fee of £5.3m, with an additional £5.3m dependent on objectives being met. He made his debut for the Seagulls on 4 February, coming on as a 75th minute substitute replacing Tariq Lamptey as Brighton went on to beat Bournemouth with a 87th minute Kaoru Mitoma goal. Buonanotte made his first start for Brighton on 28 February, playing 69 minutes of the 1–0 away win over Stoke City of the Championship with Brighton advancing to the FA Cup quarter-finals. Buonanotte claimed an assist four days later, setting up Danny Welbeck's strike, the last of the game in the 4–0 home win over West Ham.

International career
Buonanotte was called up to the Argentina national under-20 football team for the 2022 Maurice Revello Tournament in France. In January 2023, he was once again called up to the national under-20 football team ahead of the 2023 South American Championship.

On 3 March 2023, at the age of 18-and-two-months he received his first call-up for the Argentina senior squad for friendly matches against Panama and Curacao.

Career statistics

References

External links
 

2004 births
Living people
Sportspeople from Santa Fe Province
Argentine footballers
Association football midfielders
Argentina youth international footballers
Argentine Primera División players
Premier League players
Rosario Central footballers
Brighton & Hove Albion F.C. players
Argentine expatriate footballers
Argentine expatriate sportspeople in England
Expatriate footballers in England